Ben Edward Benack III, also known as Benny Benack III, (born November 23, 1990) is an American jazz trumpeter, vocalist and composer.

Early life and education 
Benny Benack III was born in Pittsburgh, Pennsylvania.  He was introduced to the trumpet by his parents at the age of nine after studying piano initially from age five. Benack was raised in the township of Upper St. Clair, Pennsylvania and attended Upper St. Clair High School. While in high school he was a part of The Gibson/Baldwin Grammy Jazz Ensemble where he met future collaborators Emmet Cohen, Bryan Carter, Grace Kelly and Chad Lefkowitz-Brown.

Benack attended The Manhattan School of Music in New York City on a full-tuition scholarship, receiving a Bachelor of Music in 2013 and Master of Music in 2015.

Career 
Benny Benack III is primarily known for his work in Jazz and Cabaret. He has performed with jazz artists Ulysses Owens Jr., Christian McBride, Aaron Johnson, Ann Hampton-Calloway and Joey DeFrancesco. Outside of jazz he has performed with Josh Groban, Diplo, Major Lazer, Ben Folds and Isaac Mizrahi.

Benack has served as the host and featured soloist of Post Modern Jukebox. He is regularly featured with Charlie Rosen & The 8-Bit Big Band.

Film and television 
Most recently Benack played on "The Late Show with Stephen Colbert" in the Late Show House Band for a handful of episodes in November 2022. Benack was also the house-trumpet player for NBC's summer variety show, "Maya & Marty" starring Maya Rudolph, Martin Short and Keenan Thompson. The show featured special guests in musical segments Jimmy Fallon, Steve Martin and Nick Jonas.

Family 
Benny is the grandson of musician Benny Benack, who is perhaps best known for writing the Pittsburgh Pirates and Steelers theme, "Beat 'Em Bucs." His father is musician Benny "Peek" Benack II. His mother Claudia Benack is a professor of music theater at Carnegie Mellon University. His sister Laura resides in Los Angeles, CA and co-leads a band "Bass Race" with her husband in which they both sing, play instruments and produce original songs.

References

1990 births
Living people